The Supreme Council of Autonomous Republic of Ajara is the supreme representative body of the Autonomous Republic of Ajara. The Supreme Council consists of members residing on the territory of the Autonomous Republic and is elected for four-year term. 15 members of Supreme Council are elected by the proportional electoral system and 6 deputies are elected by the majoritarian system. Georgian citizen from the age of 25 with a suffrage can become the member of Supreme Council.

Chairmen

References

Politics of Adjara
Legislatures of country subdivisions
Politics of Georgia (country)
Adjara
Buildings and structures in Batumi